John Robert McRay (1931 – 2018) was an archaeologist, and professor emeritus of New Testament at Wheaton College (Illinois). He directed archaeological excavations in Israel, and "his articles have appeared in [several] encyclopedias and dictionaires". He "has lectured widely on archaeology and the Bible at various colleges, universities, professional meetings and churches in the United States".

Life 
McRay was born in Holdenville, Oklahoma. His wife's name is Annette and they had three children: Rob, David, and Barrett, and they also had eight grand children and two great-grandchildren.

He died at age 86 on August 24, 2018 in Nashville, Tennessee.

Education 
In 1956 McRay earned a M.A. at Harding College, with the thesis The fact and nature of eternal punishment in the New Testament. He completed his Ph.D. in New Testament at the University of Chicago in 1967.  He also studied at the Hebrew University, at the École biblique et archéologique française de Jérusalem, and at Vanderbilt University Divinity School.

Teaching 
From 1956 to 2002, McRay had taught at four colleges: Harding University, Lipscomb University, Middle Tennessee State University and Wheaton College. After McRay got his PhD, he went on to teach at Middle Tennessee State University, David Lipscomb College (now Lipscomb University), and Harding Graduate School. From 1980 McRay joined the Wheaton's faculty, and until 2002 (for more than fifteen years), he taught in biblical studies at Wheaton College. When he retired, he was awarded emeritus status.

Excavating teams 
McRay supervised excavating teams in the Holy Land for almost 8 years in Caesarea, Sepphoris, and Herodium in Israel. He also was an expert in the languages, cultures, geography, and history of Israel-Palestine.

Organizations 
McRay was associate to the Albright Institute of Archaeological Research in Jerusalem, American Schools of Oriental Research, and a member of the editorial boards of Near East Archaeological Society Bulletin, Archaeology in the Biblical World and the Bulletin for Biblical Research, published by Institute for Biblical Research.

Works

Books

External links

References 

1931 births
2018 deaths
New Testament scholars
Wheaton College (Illinois) faculty
University of Chicago alumni